Caroticotympanic may refer to:
 Caroticotympanic arteries
 Caroticotympanic nerves